The Municipality of Ilirska Bistrica is a municipality in Slovenia. It belongs to the traditional region of Inner Carniola. The seat of the municipality is the town of Ilirska Bistrica.

The current municipality was established on 3 October 1994 from the former Municipality of Ilirska Bistrica without territorial changes.

Settlements

In addition to the municipal seat of Ilirska Bistrica, the municipality also includes the following settlements:

 Bač
 Brce
 Čelje
 Dobro Polje
 Dolenje pri Jelšanah
 Dolnja Bitnja
 Dolnji Zemon
 Fabci
 Gabrk
 Gornja Bitnja
 Gornji Zemon
 Harije
 Hrušica
 Huje
 Jablanica
 Janeževo Brdo
 Jasen
 Jelšane
 Kilovče
 Knežak
 Koritnice
 Koseze
 Kuteževo
 Mala Bukovica
 Male Loče
 Mereče
 Nova Vas pri Jelšanah
 Novokračine
 Ostrožno Brdo
 Pavlica
 Podbeže
 Podgrad
 Podgraje
 Podstenje
 Podstenjšek
 Podtabor
 Pregarje
 Prelože
 Prem
 Račice
 Ratečevo Brdo
 Rečica
 Rjavče
 Sabonje
 Smrje
 Snežnik
 Soze
 Starod
 Studena Gora
 Sušak
 Šembije
 Tominje
 Topolc
 Trpčane
 Velika Bukovica
 Veliko Brdo
 Vrbica
 Vrbovo
 Zabiče
 Zajelšje
 Zarečica
 Zarečje

References

External links
 
 Municipality of Ilirska Bistrica on Geopedia
  Ilirska Bistrica municipal site 

 
1994 establishments in Slovenia
Ilirska Bistrica